Winner is a 2017 Indian Telugu-language action comedy film jointly produced by Nallamalupu Bujji, Tagore Madhu on Sri Lakshmi Narasimha Productions & Leo Productions banner and directed by Gopichand Malineni. Starring Sai Dharam Tej, Rakul Preet Singh, Jagapati Babu  and music composed by S. Thaman.

Production began in March 2016 and principal photography commenced in August 2016 in Hyderabad, other shooting locations included Kyiv, Lviv, Istanbul, Ooty and Bangalore. The film was released worldwide on 24 February 2017.

Plot
Dharmendra Reddy is a business magnate, whose only son, Mahendra Reddy, is one of the best jockey in the country, who leaves the house after marrying his love interest Lakshmi against Dharmendra's wishes. Mahendra leads a happy life, after some time Lakshmi dies giving birth to a baby boy Siddharth Reddy / Siddu, from that time Mahendra was everything to him both of are bound in a doting love bondage. After his son left the house Dharmendra Reddy's business comes almost to zero level, so he has no other choice except to get back his son. After that he decides to separate Siddu from his father, therefore he constructs a barrier between them and separates them by a meticulous plan of making remarriage to his son with his friend's daughter and makes Siddu forcibly to run away from home.

Siddu grows up to be a father-hater, and works as a creative head of a newspaper and also has a grudge on races and horses. On another hand, for several years Mahendra relentless tries to find Siddu. Siddu falls in love with Sitara, but learns that her goal to become a successful athlete to win National Championship in running race that's why she under the training by bluffing to her parents that she is studying. While he tries to impress her she shows aversion towards him.  Due to this, a drunk Siddhu meddles with her life by revealing her secret to her father Rajeev Reddy. So he immediately settles her marriage with a Best Jockey.  Siddu also reaches to the marriage where Sitara comes up with a plan to escape the marriage that she is loving Siddu and introduces him as a number one jockey. 

Sithara wants to conduct a race between them and she will marry the person will win it. In between the quarrel, Mahendra Reddy arrives and shocking says the jockey as his separated son Siddharth Reddy and accepts the challenge. Siddu is confused with this incident, where he kidnaps Dharmendra Reddy's PA and Siddu is flabbergasted, realizing that the person is Aadhi, an assassin and jockey, who impersonates and settles with his family on the orders of Dharmendra Reddy to stop unnecessary expenditure in the search of the separated son. Siddu decides to take up the challenge by becoming a professional jockey. Siddu manages to gain Sitara love by helping her to participate and win the National Championship. Siddhu also wins the race and reunites with his father (who has learnt the truth from Dharmendra Reddy's PA), and thrashes Aadhi. Dharmendra Reddy realizes his mistake and reunites with Siddu and Mahendra, thus becoming a Winner in challenge and life.

Cast

Soundtrack

Music composed by S. Thaman. Music released on ADITYA Music Company.

References

External links 
 

2017 films
2010s Telugu-language films
2017 masala films
2017 action drama films
Films scored by Thaman S
Indian action drama films
Films directed by Gopichand Malineni
Films shot in Ukraine
Films shot in Kyiv
Films shot in Lviv
Films shot in Turkey
Films shot in Istanbul
Films shot in Bangalore
Films shot in Ooty